Myladi is a panchayat town in Kanniyakumari district in the Indian state of Tamil Nadu.

Demographics
 India census, Myladi had a population of 8961. Males constitute 50% of the population and females 50%. Myladi has an average literacy rate of 72%, higher than the national average of 59.5%: male literacy is 76%, and female literacy is 68%. In Myladi, 11% of the population is under 6 years of age. Here religions like Hinduism, Christianity, and Islam  are followed. The Ringeltaube Vethamonikam Memorial Church here, founded by Christian missionary William Tobias Ringeltaube, is one of the largest and oldest churches in India. Stone sculpture making is famous in Myladi. coconut is a major plantation.  Myladi is surrounded by two mountains and scientists says there is no possibilities of earthquake in Myladi followed by tsunami.

Popular scientists from Myladi
Dr.Sivanandi Rajadurai aka Mylaudy S. Rajadurai is a scientist in the field of catalysis, physical chemistry, and emission control, focused on protection of the global environment and is a corporate executive.

References

Cities and towns in Kanyakumari district